The 1991 Australian Men's Hardcourt Championships was a men's tennis tournament played on indoor hard courts in Adelaide, Australia and was part of the ATP World Series of the 1991 ATP Tour. It was the 14th edition of the tournament and was held from 31 December 1990 to 7 January 1991. Unseeded Nicklas Kulti won the singles title.

Finals

Singles

 Nicklas Kulti defeated  Michael Stich 6–3, 1–6, 6–2
 It was Kulti's only singles title of the year and the 1st of his career.

Doubles

 Wayne Ferreira /  Stefan Kruger defeated  Paul Haarhuis /  Mark Koevermans 6–4, 4–6, 6–4

Notes

References

External links
 ATP tournament profile
 ITF tournament edition details

 
Australian Men's Hardcourt Championships
Next Generation Adelaide International
1990s in Adelaide
December 1990 sports events in Australia
January 1991 sports events in Australia